Portage—Lisgar is a federal electoral district in Manitoba, Canada, that has been represented in the House of Commons of Canada since 1997.

Demographics

According to the Canada 2021 Census

Ethnic groups: 82.3% White, 11.5% Indigenous, 2.2% Filipino, 1.5% South Asian

Portage—Lisgar is the riding with the highest percentage of native German speakers (23.6% of the population) in all of Canada. Only  Inuktitut (Nunavut: 66.8%) and Panjabi (Punjabi) (Newton—North Delta, in British Columbia: 33.4%) exceed this concentration of native speakers of a non-official language in a single riding.

Geography
This is a rural district that includes the cities of Portage la Prairie, Winkler, and Morden, and the towns of Carman and Altona.

History
The electoral district was created in 1996 from the former districts of Lisgar—Marquette, Portage—Interlake and Provencher.

This riding lost territory to Dauphin—Swan River—Neepawa and Brandon—Souris, and gained territory from Provencher and Selkirk—Interlake during the 2012 electoral redistribution.

Members of Parliament
This riding has elected the following Members of Parliament:

Current Member of Parliament
Its most recent Member of Parliament was Candice Bergen, who resigned on February 1, 2023. She was first elected in the 2008 Canadian federal election

Election results

See also
 List of Canadian federal electoral districts
 Past Canadian electoral districts

References

 
 Expenditure - 2008
Expenditures - 2004
Expenditures - 2000
Expenditures - 1997
2008 Results

Notes

Manitoba federal electoral districts
Morden, Manitoba
Portage la Prairie
Winkler, Manitoba
1996 establishments in Manitoba
Constituencies established in 1996